Garside is a surname, and may refer to:

 Benjamin Charles Garside (1863–?), American machinist
 Bernhard Garside (born 1962), British diplomat
 Bettis Garside (1894–1989), author
 Charles Garside (1898–1964), lawyer
 Charles Brierley Garside (1818–1876), English Roman Catholic priest
 James Garside (born 1885), English footballer 
 Jeannine Garside (born 1978), Canadian boxer
 John Garside, British chemical engineer
 KatieJane Garside (born 1968), English singer and writer
 Kenneth Garside (1913–1983), British librarian and intelligence officer
 Mark Garside (born 1989), Scottish ice hockey player
 Melanie Garside-Wight (born 1979), English footballer
 Robert Garside (born 1967), British runner
 William Garside (1872–1951), Scottish footballer

See also 

 Garside classification
 Garside element

Surnames
English-language surnames
Surnames of English origin
Surnames of Scottish origin
Surnames of British Isles origin